Hoth Khan Baloch, also known as Hoath Khan Baloch, was a ruler of what is now Balochistan and one of the four sons of Jalal Khan, the founder of the Baloch people. He was one of the five founding members of the five main Baloch divisions/tribes. The Hoth people are the direct descendants of Hoth Khan. He ruled Balochistan around 1200 CE.

Family 
As the son of Jalal Khan, Hoth Khan was the brother of the founders of the other Balochi tribes founders, namely Rind Khan, Lashar Khan,  Kora Khan, and Bibi Jato. 

The folklore tale of Sassui Punnhun describes Hoth Khan as the grandfather of Mir Punnhun Khan (Mir Dostein Hoth), whose father was Hoth Khan's son Mir Aalii.

.

References 

Baloch people